Baroness Myriam Ullens de Schooten Whettnall (born 23 September 1952<ref>{{Cite web|url=https://www.ellisphere.fr/dirigeant/ULLENSDESHOOTEN-MYRIAM-19520923|title = Myriam ULLENS DE SHOOTEN - Président de lentreprise THEMUS PRODUCTION à PARIS | Ellisphere}}</ref>) is a German-born Belgian entrepreneur engaged in art, fashion and philanthropy.

 Early life and education 

Myriam Ullens née'' Lechien was born in Cologne, Germany, and spent her childhood in Germany where her father was an officer in the Belgian army. When she turned five, she moved to a boarding school in Belgium and studied in Namur, and then in Liège.

Early Business 

At the age of 24, Ullens launched her first business "La Petite Salade", a salad delivery service that she sold four years later.

Immediately thereafter, she created a professional pastry shop named "Sweetly" in Brussels.

In 1991 she met her future husband, Baron Guy Ullens, a Belgium businessman, and shortly thereafter she sold Sweetly in order to devote her time to non-profit organizations.

Foundations

Education 

Ullens built institutions to support the Nepal's disadvantaged children, including two orphanages focused on helping children suffering from  malnutrition. She founded with her husband Guy Ullens the Ullens School in Lalitpur, the first school in Nepal to offer the International Baccalaureate Diploma Programme.

Mimi Ullens Foundation 

After surviving breast cancer, Ullens recognized a need for patients to refocus on their physical and mental well-being while being treated in hospitals. In 2006, she founded the Mimi Ullens Foundation to support seven centres that are located within the oncology departments of its partner hospitals. These centres provide 15,000 cancer patients with psychological support.

Art 

The Ullens Center for Contemporary Art (UCCA) is an independent, not-for-profit art center serving a global Beijing public. It was founded by Guy and Myriam Ullens in November 2007.

On 11 February 2017 the Ullens Center for Contemporary Art received the 2016 Global Fine Art Awards for Best Contemporary / Postwar / SoloArtist “Rauschenberg in China”.

Ullens sits on the board of trustees of The Royal Drawing School, which was founded by the Prince of Wales to provide a space where expert teachers could help students with part-time drawing courses each year for adults and children of all ages and abilities.

Maison Ullens 

In 2009, Ullens launched her own fashion label, named :fr:Maison Ullens.

StoryTeller 

Myriam Ullens is publishing her first novel, "Distant Starless Nights" in February 2017.

Personal life 

Ullens is married to Baron Guy Ullens de Schooten Whettnall since 1999. She has two children from a former marriage.

References 

1952 births
Living people
Belgian businesspeople
Social entrepreneurs
Barons of Belgium